The Weiss Center, formerly the  U.S. Post Office-Manchester Main is a historic building at 491 Main Street in Manchester, Connecticut.  It was built in 1931 and was listed on the National Register of Historic Places in 1986 for its architecture.  It includes Colonial Revival, Classical Revival, and Georgian Revival architectural features.

Description and history
The Robert Weiss Center is located at the northern end of Manchester's main downtown commercial district, at the northeast corner of Main Street (Connecticut Route 83) and Center Street (United States Route 6).  It is a single-story masonry structure, built out of brick with limestone trim, with a unique pentagonal floorplan.  It presents a broad three-bay front entry facade at an angle to the street intersection, with a projecting Classical four-column portico at the center.  The portico has round Doric columns rising to an entablature and a gabled pediment studded with modillion blocks.  The center of the gable is decorated with garlands and swags.  The flanking windows are tall round-headed sashes.  The interior lobby area features brown tile flooring with white marble borders and wainscoting.

The building was constructed in 1931 by the federal government to serve as Manchester's main post office.  It has a unique design, prompted by difficulties of its location, credited to United States Supervising Architect James Wetmore.  It was built by Pieretti Brothers contractors.  The post office occupied it until 1991, after which the building was acquired by the city.  It was officially named the Weiss Center in 1994.

See also 
National Register of Historic Places listings in Hartford County, Connecticut
List of United States post offices

References 

Colonial Revival architecture in Connecticut
Neoclassical architecture in Connecticut
Georgian Revival architecture in Connecticut
Government buildings completed in 1931
Buildings and structures in Hartford County, Connecticut
Manchester
Manchester, Connecticut
National Register of Historic Places in Hartford County, Connecticut